M. K. Hubli is a village in the southern state of Karnataka, India. It is located in the Kittur taluk of Belgaum district in Karnataka. M K Hubballi's full form is Mugut Khan Hubballi

Demographics
At the 2001 India census, M.K.Hubballi had a population of 12658 with 6395 males and 6263 females.

See also
 Belgaum
 Districts of Karnataka

References

External links
 http://Belgaum.nic.in/

Villages in Belagavi district